Gustav Knuth (7 July 1901 – 1 February 1987) was a German film actor. He appeared in more than 120 films between 1935 and 1982 and starred in the TV series Alle meine Tiere. He was married to the actress Elisabeth Lennartz.

Selected filmography

 The Valley of Love (1935) - Hans Stork
 Heimweh (1937) - Christof Peleikis, Fischer und Steuermann
 Shadows Over St. Pauli (1938) - Oschi Rasmus
 The Curtain Falls (1939) - Dr. Cornelsen
 Mann für Mann (1939) - Walter Zügel
 The Desert Song (1939) - Nic Brenten, Ingenieur
 Between Hamburg and Haiti (1940) - Henry Brinkmann
 The Girl from Fano (1941) - Fischer Frerk
 Friedemann Bach (1941) - Johann Christoph Altnikol
 Pedro Will Hang (1941) - Pedro, Hirte
 The Big Game (1942) - Trainer Karl Wildbrandt
 Gefährtin meines Sommers (1943) - Georg Polenz, Müller
 Ein glücklicher Mensch (1943) - Georg, sein Sohn
 Große Freiheit Nr. 7 (1944) - Fiete
 Tierarzt Dr. Vlimmen (1944) - Autofahrer
 Das Leben geht weiter (1945) - Dr. Ewald Martens
 Under the Bridges (1946) - Willy
 Journey to Happiness (1948) - Holm, Antiquitätenhändler
 Das Geheimnis der roten Katze (1949) - Pitou
 Tromba (1949) - Ernesto Spadoli, Artist
 Einmaleins der Ehe (1949) - Willy Obermayer
 The Blue Straw Hat (1949) - Caesar von Waldau
 Beloved Liar (1950) - Braubach
 Theodore the Goalkeeper (1950) - Knospe
 A Day Will Come (1950) - Paul
 Land der Sehnsucht (1950)
 Eine Frau mit Herz (1951) - Papi Straßmeier
 Das seltsame Leben des Herrn Bruggs (1951) - Eberhard Bruggs
 The Blue Star of the South (1951) - Bruck
 Palace Hotel (1952) - Loosli, Kellermeister
 That Can Happen to Anyone (1952) - Herr Schwidders
 Der fröhliche Weinberg (1952) - J.B. (Jean Baptiste) Gunderloch
 Die Venus vom Tivoli (1953) - Hermann Schninkat
 Not Afraid of Big Animals (1953) - Schimmel
 Must We Get Divorced? (1953) - Dr. Spitzkoetter
 The Night Without Morals (1953) - Abruzzo
 The Abduction of the Sabine Women (1954) - Emanuel Striese
 The Mosquito (1954) - Karrari
 On the Reeperbahn at Half Past Midnight (1954) - Brandstetter snr.
 Beloved Enemy (1955) - Soldat Horner
 Reaching for the Stars (1955) - Carlo
 Die Ratten (1955) - Karl John
 Sky Without Stars (1955) - Otto Friese
 Sissi (1955) - Duke Max in Bavaria
 I Often Think of Piroschka (1955) - Istvan Rácz
  (1955) - Major Hinrichsen
 Regine (1956) - Der alte Winter
 Hengst Maestoso Austria (1956) - Loisl, Bildhauer und Maler
 My Husband's Getting Married Today (1956) - Karl Nielsen
 If We All Were Angels (1956) - Kommissar
 S'Waisechind vo Engelberg (1956) - Andreas
 Spy for Germany (1956) - Roger Bentley
 Sissi - Die junge Kaiserin (1956) - Duke Max in Bavaria
 The Beggar Student (1956) - Oberst Ollendorf
 The Girl and the Legend (1957) - Carlton Heep
 ...und die Liebe lacht dazu (1957) - Klaus Papendiek
  (1957) - Jack Hover
 Der 10. Mai (1957) - deutscher Konsul
 The Count of Luxemburg (1957) - Fürst Basil Basilowitsch
 Sissi - Schicksalsjahre einer Kaiserin (1957) - Duke Max in Bavaria
 Europas neue Musikparade 1958 (1957) - Hellmann
 A Piece of Heaven (1957) - Ludwig von Pröhl
 Man ist nur zweimal jung (1958) - Ruedi Stuffer
 Ihr 106. Geburtstag (1958) - Anton Burger
 Der schwarze Blitz (1958) - Hotelier Haringer
  (1958) - Waldemar Graf Hatzberg zu Eberstein
 The House of Three Girls (1958) - Christian Tschöll
 Kleine Leute mal ganz groß (1958) - Ferdinand Sommerrock
 Arena of Fear (1959) - Carl de Vries
 Alle lieben Peter (1959) - Generaldirektor Steiner
 Two Times Adam, One Time Eve (1959) - Viirimäki
 The Buddenbrooks (1959) - Diederich Schwarzkopf
 Freddy unter fremden Sternen (1959) - Henry O'Brien
 I'm Marrying the Director (1960) - Friedrich Kiesberg
 Das kunstseidene Mädchen (1960) - Arthur Grönland
 Kein Engel ist so rein (1960) - Sepp Ziegler
 Stage Fright (1960) - Herr Seipel
 The Man in the Black Derby (1960) - Generaldirektor Meißen
 Conny and Peter Make Music (1960) - Trautmann
 A Woman for Life (1960) - Vater Barnebusch
  (1960) - Erich Füllgrabe
 You Don't Shoot at Angels (1960) - Carlos
 Sacred Waters (1960) - Der Presi, Hans Waldisch, Wirt zum Bären
  (1961) - Konsul Otto Seeberg
 Musik ist Trumpf (1961) - Hoteldirektor
 Only the Wind (1961) - Sean O'Connor
 Chikita (1961) - Eugen Stärkle
 The Liar (1961) - Rotbarth
 Alle meine Tiere (1962–1963, TV series, 9 episodes) - Dr. Karl Hofer
 Die Nylonschlinge (1963) - Charles Clifton
 My Daughter and I (1963) - Dr. Walther
 Die ganze Welt ist himmelblau (1964) - John P. Hoover
 I Learned It from Father (1964) - Theaterdirektor Löwe
 The World Revolves Around You (1964) - Holger Andreesen, Lilians Vater
  (1964, TV film) - Herbert Beutler/Isaac Newton
 Legend of a Gunfighter (1964) - Richard Bradley
 Shots in Threequarter Time (1965) - Igor
 Heidi (1965) - Alp-Oehi, Heidi's Grandfather
 Aunt Frieda (1965) - Gustav Schultheiss
  (1966, TV film) - Franz Lehmhuhn
  (1966) - Mr. Abonyi, Stefan's father
 Onkel Filser – Allerneueste Lausbubengeschichten (1966) - Gustav Schultheiss
  (1967–1968, TV series, 8 episodes) - Heinrich König
 Sexy Susan Sins Again (1968) - Mayor
 Salto Mortale (1969–1972, TV series, 18 episodes) - Carlo Doria
  (1969) - Bürgermeister
 Charley's Uncle (1969) - Kapitän Tressblekken / Onkel Reginald Tressblekken
 Pepe, der Paukerschreck – Die Lümmel von der ersten Bank, III. Teil (1969) - Kurt Nietnagel
 Die Powenzbande (1974, TV miniseries) - Baltus Powenz
 Iron Gustav (1979, TV miniseries) - Gustav Hackendahl
 Der Bockerer (1981) - Vater Knabe

Further reading
Gustav Knuth, Mit einem Lächeln im Knopfloch, Verlagsgesellschaft R. Gleiss & Co., Hamburg, 1974.  (autobiography)

References

External links

1901 births
1987 deaths
Actors from Braunschweig
German male film actors
German male television actors
20th-century German male actors